Zak Butters (born 8 September 2000) is a professional Australian rules footballer who plays for the Port Adelaide Football Club in the Australian Football League (AFL). He was recruited by Port Adelaide with the 12th draft pick in the 2018 AFL draft.

Early life 
Butters grew up in Bacchus Marsh and attended Maribyrnong College as part of their selective sports academy. Zak Butters played for the Western Jets in the TAC Cup.

AFL career
Butters made his AFL debut in Port Adelaide's win over Melbourne in the opening round of the 2019 AFL season kicking two goals. He was named in the 40 man All Australian squad in 2020.

Statistics
 'Statistics are correct to the end of round 21 2022.

|- style="background-color: #EAEAEA"
! scope="row" style="text-align:center" | 2019
|
| 18 || 19 || 12 || 7 || 137 || 132 || 269 || 51 || 48 || 0.6 || 0.4 || 7.2 || 7.0 || 14.2 || 2.7 || 2.5
|-
! scope="row" style="text-align:center" | 2020
|
| 18 || 17 || 11 || 6 || 129 || 119 || 248 || 55 || 47 || 0.7 || 0.4 || 7.6 || 7.0 || 14.6 || 3.2 || 2.8
|- style="background-color: #EAEAEA"
! scope="row" style="text-align:center" | 2021
|
| 18 || 12 || 8 || 2 || 111 || 114 || 225 || 50 || 42 || 0.6 || 0.1 || 9.2 || 9.5 || 18.7 || 4.1 || 3.5
|- style="background-color: #EAEAEA"
! scope="row" style="text-align:center" | 2022
|
| 18 || 18 || 6 || 7 || 219 || 173 || 392 || 69 || 64 || 0.3 || 0.3 || 12.1 || 9.6 || 21.7 || 3.8 || 3.5
|- class="sortbottom"
! colspan=3| Career
! 66
! 37
! 22
! 596
! 538
! 1134
! 225
! 201
! 0.5
! 0.3
! 9.0
! 8.1
! 17.1
! 3.4
! 3.0
|}

References

External links

2000 births
Living people
Port Adelaide Football Club players
Australian rules footballers from Victoria (Australia)
People from Bacchus Marsh